Unni-Lise Jonsmoen  (born 21 April 1936) is a Norwegian illustrator and children's writer.

She was born in Oslo to Margit Schulze and Rolf Martin Hansen. She is married to children's writer Ola Jonsmoen, and the couple settled in Alvdal.

Jonsmoen is educated at the Norwegian National Academy of Craft and Art Industry. Her children's book illustrations include Det hendte i Taremareby (1960, text by Ingebrigt Davik), Singeling for rare ting (1961, text by Ola Jonsmoen), and Humle Brumle (1962, text by Ola Jonsmoen). In addition to children's books, she has also illustrated poetry collections and textbooks. Her own books include Svarttrosten som forsov seg (1979), Lars og Ola på tytingtur (1980), and Kjenner du fru Frodig? (1982). 

She was awarded Hedmark County Municipality's Cultural Prize in 1989, jointly with her husband Ola Jonsmoen.

References

1936 births
Living people
Artists from Oslo
People from Alvdal
Norwegian illustrators
Norwegian women illustrators
Norwegian children's writers
Oslo National Academy of the Arts alumni
Writers from Oslo